A bronze statue of Lázaro Cárdenas is installed in Puerto Vallarta's Lázaro Cárdenas Park, in the Mexican state of Jalisco. It was created by a group of students from the University of Michoacán and it was unveiled in 1970. As part of a municipal rehabilitation program, the statue was restored in 2020 and authorities decided to rotate it 180°.

See also

 1970 in art
 Statue of Lázaro Cárdenas (Madrid)

References

External links
 
 Lazaro Cardenas - Puerto Vallarta, Mexico at Waymarking

1970 establishments in Mexico
1970 sculptures
Monuments and memorials in Jalisco
Outdoor sculptures in Puerto Vallarta
Sculptures of men in Mexico
Statues in Jalisco
Statues of presidents of Mexico
Zona Romántica